The Bulgarian Navy is the navy of the Republic of Bulgaria and forms part of the Bulgarian Armed Forces. It has been largely overlooked in the reforms that Bulgaria had to go through in order to comply with NATO standards, mostly because of the great expense involved and the fact that naval assaults are not considered to be a great concern for the country's security. That is why three of the four s (excluding Slava) are now docked and have been out of operation for some time. The last one was decommissioned in November 2011. Only the more modern frigates, corvettes and missile crafts are on active duty.

The Bulgarian Navy is centred in two main bases. One is near the city of Varna. The other is by the village of Atia, near the city of Burgas.

Operational history

First Balkan War
The Bulgarian Navy's first combat action was the 1912 Battle of Kaliakra during the First Balkan War, when four Bulgarian torpedo boats attacked the Ottoman cruiser Hamidiye;  managed to score a hit, forcing Hamidiye to retreat back to Istanbul for emergency repairs.

Second Balkan War

The Bulgarian Navy scuttled its four Danube gunboats during the Second Balkan War, probably to avoid capture by the invading Romanian Army. They were still present on the Bulgarian Navy list in August 1916.

World War I
When Bulgaria entered World War I in 1915, its navy consisted mainly of a French-built torpedo gunboat called Nadezhda and six torpedo boats. It mainly engaged in mine warfare actions in the Black Sea against the Russian Black Sea Fleet and allowed the Germans to station two U-boats at Varna, one of which came under Bulgarian control in 1916 as Podvodnik No. 18. Russian mines sank one Bulgarian torpedo boat and damaged one more during the war.

World War II
The Bulgarian Navy during World War II supported the Axis Powers in the Black Sea and consisted mainly of four obsolete Drazki-class torpedo boats, five modern Lurrsen type motor torpedo boats and three formerly Dutch motor torpedo boats. Bulgaria and the Soviet Union were not at war with each other, but there was still little naval fighting with Soviet submarines operating in Bulgarian waters, its main action taking place in October 1941.
 
The so-called Operation Varna consisted in the minelaying of the Bulgarian coast by the Romanian minelayers , Regele Carol I and Dacia, escorted by Romanian  Năluca, Sborul and Smeul, Romanian gunboats  and Căpitan Dumitrescu and Bulgarian torpedo boats , Smeli and Hrabri. The operation, lasting between 7 and 16 October 1941, was largely successful, as despite the loss of the Romanian auxiliary minelayer Regele Carol I to a Soviet mine, the five minefields laid by the Romanian minelayers along the Bulgarian coast are credited with the sinking of four Soviet submarines: S-34, L-24, Shch-211 and Shch-210, although the latter could have also been sunk by German aircraft or depth-charged by the Bulgarian patrol boats Belomorets and Chernomorets.

On 6 December 1941, Belomorets and Chernomorets depth-charged and sank the Soviet submarine Shch-204.

Soviet submarines also laid mines near the Bulgarian coast, the 2304-ton Bulgarian steamer Chipka being sunk off Varna by mines laid by the submarine L-4.
 
On 19 May 1943, the Bulgarian torpedo boat Smeli foundered between Varna and Burgas during a storm.

Any hostilities ended when Bulgaria changed sides and joined the Allied powers in September 1944.

Cold War 
In line with Soviet naming practices the navy of the Bulgarian People's Army was called the Military Naval Fleet (Военноморски флот (ВМФ)). The merchant marine, which was to mobilize in wartime in support of the regular navy was called Bulgarian Sea Fleet (Български Морски Флот (БМФ)).

In the 1970s the Burgas Naval Base relocated to Atia with a corresponding change in name.

The Naval Fleet Staff was located in Varna.

Post Warsaw Pact 
The Bulgarian Communist Party was forced to give up its political monopoly on 10 November 1989 under the influence of the Revolutions of 1989. With the restoration of freedom from the Warsaw Pact entanglement, it became a member of NATO in 2004, and after several years of reforms, it joined the European Union and the single market in 2007, despite EU concerns over government corruption.

Wandelaar (F-912), built in 1977, was renamed to Drazki. That same year the Bulgarian ship Smeli took part as a full NATO member for the first time in NATO OAE (Operation Active Endeavour). In 2006, following a decision of the Bulgarian National Assembly, Drazki deployed as part of the United Nations Interim Forces in Lebanon (UNIFIL), patrolling the territorial waters of Lebanon under German command. This was the first time the Bulgarian Navy took part in an international peacekeeping operation. The Bulgarian government purchased two more Wielingen-class frigates and one  in 2007.

On 21 July 2020 took place the official inauguration of the Maritime Coordination Center in Varna. This was an important step towards greater NATO and regional cooperation in the Black Sea region.

Command structure in 1989

Directly subordinate to Naval Staff 
 Electronic Warfare Section (Отделение РЕБ)
 Independent Electronic Warfare Battalion type "NS" (Отделен батальон тип "НС") (one company type N for jamming of enemy communications and one company type S for jamming of enemy targeting systems)
 8th Submarine Division, Varna Naval Base, with 4x Romeo-class submarines (Two were decommissioned without replacement in 1990, one in 1992. Last one in 2011)
 81 "Victory" ("Победа", delivered in 1972, former Soviet S-57), 82 "Victoria" ("Виктория", delivered in 1972, former Soviet S-212), 83 "Hope" ("Надежда", delivered in 1983, former Soviet S-36), 84 "Glory" ("Слава", delivered in 1985, former Soviet S-38) (traditional female names)
 2nd Coastal Missile Brigade, south of Varna, with 4K51 Rubezh anti-ship missiles
 10th Missile & Torpedo Boat Brigade, in Sozopol (mixed composition of the divisions, the torpedo boats had the dual role to attack enemy vessels with their torpedoes and to provide target acquisition for the missile boats)
 122 (Commander's cutter, 10-ton Soviet project 371)
 10th Missile & Torpedo Boat Division
 missile boats Project 205: 101 "Lightning" ("Светкавица", delivered in 1982, former Soviet R-496, improved project 205U); 102 "Hurricane" ("Ураган", delivered in 1977, former Soviet R-169, improved project 205U); 103 "Storm" ("Буря", delivered in 1971, former Soviet R-176?, basic project 205)
 torpedo boats Project 206: 104 "Eagle" ("Орел"), 105 "Hawk" ("Ястреб"), 106 "Albatross" ("Албатрос")
 11th Missile & Torpedo Boat Division
 missile boats Project 205: 111 "Typhoon" ("Тайфун", delivered in 1982, former Soviet R-496, improved project 205U); 112 "Thunder" ("Гръм", delivered in 1977, former Soviet R-169, improved project 205U); 113 "Whirlwind" ("Смерч", delivered in 1971, former Soviet R-176?, basic project 205)
 torpedo boats Project 206: 114 "Snow leopard" ("Барс"), 115 "Jaguar" ("Ягуар"), 116 "Panther" ("Пантера")
 Coastal Base Sozopol (Брегова База Созопол, the brigade's logistic formation)
 274 (fireboat project 364 of Soviet build)
 25th Signals Regiment, in Varna
 63rd Anti-submarine Helicopter Squadron, at Chayka (Bulgarian for "seagull") Independent Naval Helicopter Base in Varna (in the Chayka suburb), flying 8x Mi-14PL anti-submarine helicopters (nr. 801, and nr. 810 of the original ten were lost), 1 x Mi-14BT (nr. 811; nr. 812 had been retired in 1986 and the minesweeping equipment removed from 811. Afterwards nr. 811 was used for transport tasks) and 1 x Ka-25C (Hormone-B, nr. 821, used for OTH targeting of the shore-based AShM systems).
 65th Maritime Special Reconnaissance Detachment (65-ти Морски Специален Разузннавателен Отряд (65ти МСРО)), in Varna (Tihina) (Navy frogmen)
 130mm Coastal Artillery Training Battery, in Varna (in wartime the navy would mobilize the 1st (Varna) and 2nd (Burgas) Coastal Artillery Regiments with 5 batteries each)
 People's Higher Naval School "Nikola Vaptsarov", in Varna
 44th Surveillance and Signals Battalion - Danube River, in Ruse (44-ти батальон за наблюдение и свръзки - река Дунав) (Radar and SIGINT)
 Rear (Тил) (logistic services)

Varna Naval Base 
 Varna Naval Base, in Varna
 2 commander's cutters of Project 371
 1st Anti-Submarine Ships Division
 Riga-class frigates: 11 "Bold" ("Дръзки", delivered in 1957, former Soviet Black Sea Fleet SKR-67), 12 "Brave" ("Смели", delivered in 1958, former Black Sea Fleet SKR-53, replaced on Sept 4 1989 by the Koni-class frigate 11 "Brave", this caused renumbering of the Riga-class ships, but they were retired only a year later), 13 "Cheerful" ("Бодри", delivered in 1985, former Soviet Baltic Fleet SKR "Kobchik") (note that "Bold", "Brave" and "Cheerful" are adjectives in plural)
 Poti-class small ASW ships: 14 "Brave" ("Храбри", delivered in 1975, former Soviet MPK-106), 15 "Fearless" ("Безстрашни", delivered in 1975, former Soviet MPK-125) (note that "Brave" and "Fearless" are adjectives in plural)
 3rd Minesweepers Division
 31 "Iskar" ("Искър"), 32 "Tsibar" ("Цибър"), 33 "Dobrotich" ("Добротич"), 34 "Captain-Lieutenant Kiril Minkov" ("Капитан-лейтенант Кирил Минков"), 35 "Captain-Lieutenant Evstati Vinarov" ("Капитан-лейтенант Евстати Винаров"), 36 "Captain I Rank Dimitar Paskalev" ("Капитан I-ви ранг Димитър Паскалев") (minehunters project 257D/DME, Soviet second hand, NATO reporting name Vanya)
 5th Minesweepers Division (Coastal Base Balchik)
 51 - 56 (minehunters of project 1259.2 project "Malachite", NATO reporting name Olya, built in Michurin), 2 auxiliary cutters of project 501 (former auxiliary minesweeping boats) and a commander's cutter of project 371
 18th Independent Division of Special Purpose Ships (former 18th Harbour Area Security Ships, includes supply, rescue and support ships and small patrol craft)
 300 "General Vladimir Zaimov" ("Генерал Владимир Заимов") (Command ship Bulgarian project 589, built in Ruse, also used for SIGINT of the Turkish Navy)
 221 "Jupiter" ("Юпитер") (East German fire-/ tugboat project 700, used as fireboat, salvage tugboat, submarine rescue ship and target tow for the coastal artillery and ships)
 401 "Admiral Branimir Ormanov" ("Адмирал Бранимир Орманов") (Polish project 861-МВ hydrographic ship, built in 1977)
 206 "Captain I Rank Dimitar Dobrev" ("Капитан І ранг Димитър Добрев") (Polish project 1799 (class 130 for the Soviet Navy) degaussing ship, built in 1988, the modern Polish Navy ship ORP Kontradmirał Xawery Czernicki is a development on the same hull type)
 311 "Anton Ivanov", later "Mitsar" and "Anlain" ("Антон Иванов", "Мицар", "Анлайн", Auxiliary transport (replenishment) ship Bulgarian project 102, built in Ruse in 1979, main task was to provide en route replenishment for the Bulgarian ships, committed to the Soviet Navy Operational Mediterranean Squadron)
 223 (diving support boat Bulgarian project 245, built in Varna in 1980)
 121, 215 and 216 (multirole motor cutters Bulgarian project 160, built in Varna)
 1 fireboat type L26, pennant number changed several times (built in Rostock, GDR in 1954-55)
 218 and 219 (auxiliary cutters, former minesweeping boats type R376 "Sever")
 55th Surveillance and Signals Battalion (55-ти батальон за наблюдение и свръзки) (Radar and SIGINT)
 Repair Workshop
 Shore based support units

Atia Naval Base 
 Atia Naval Base, east of Burgas 
 2 commander's cutters of project 371
 4th Small Anti-Submarine Ships Division
 Poti-class small ASW ships: 41 "Flying" ("Летящи", delivered in 1982, former Soviet MPK-77), 42 "Vigilant" ("Бдителни", delivered in 1982, former Soviet MPK-148), 43 "Persistent" ("Напористи", delivered in 1982, former Soviet MPK-109), 44 "Stern (Rigorous)" ("Строги", delivered in 1975 to Varna, transferred in 1982 to Burgas, former Soviet MPK-59) (note that "Flying", "Vigilant", "Persistent" and "Rigorous" are adjectives in plural)
 6th Minesweepers Division
 61 "Breeze" ("Бриз"), 62 "Squall" ("Шквал"), 63 "Surf" ("Прибой"), 64 "Storm" ("Щорм") (minehunters project 1265 "Yakhont")
 65, 66, 67, 68 (minesweepers project 1258E "Korund", NATO reporting name Yevgenya)
 7th Landing Ships Division
 701 "Sirius" ("Сириус") and 702 "Antares" ("Антарес") (Polish project 770Е medium tank landing ships, NATO reporting name Polnocny)
 703 - 712 (Soviet project 106K small tank landing ship and auxiliary minelayers, practically self-propelled landing barges, built in Ruse and Burgas, NATO reporting name Vydra)
 (another 14 project 106K small tank landing ships and auxiliary minelayers mothballed after construction and stored by Bulgarian Sea Fleet (the state-owned merchant marine) as wartime mobilization stock)
 96th Independent Division of Special Purpose Ships (former 96th Harbour Area Security Ships, includes supply, rescue and support ships and small patrol craft)
 301 "Captain Kiril Halachev" ("Капитан Кирил Халачев") (Command ship Bulgarian project 589, built in Ruse)
 302 "Bolshevik" ("Болшевик", Auxiliary transport (replenishment) ship Bulgarian project 102, built in Ruse in 1987, main task was to provide en route replenishment for the Bulgarian ships, committed to the Soviet Navy Operational Mediterranean Squadron)
 323 (diving support boat Bulgarian project 245, built in Varna in 1980)
 331 (torpedo salvage boat Bulgarian project 205, built in Varna in 1980)
 312 and 313 (multirole motor cutters Bulgarian project 160, built in Varna)
 1 fireboat type L26, pennant number changed several times (built in Rostock, GDR in 1954-55)
 57 and 58 (auxiliary cutters, former minesweeping boats type R376 "Sever")
 66th Surveillance and Signals Battalion (66-ти батальон за наблюдение и свръзки) (Radar and SIGINT)
 Coastal Radiolocation Station "Periscope I" (ELINT unit)
 Repair Workshop
 Shore based support units

Naval Equipment 
In 1989 the people's navy's inventory consisted of:

 4x Romeo-class submarines (all decommissioned with last in 2011)
 3x Riga-class frigates (One decommissioned in 1989, two in 1990)
 1x Koni-class frigate (Commissioned in December 1989)
 6x Poti-class anti-submarine warfare corvettes
 1x Pauk-class corvette (Commissioned in 1989, a second Pauk-class corvette was transferred from the Soviet Union in 1990)
 6x Osa-class missile boats
 6x Shershen-class torpedo boats
 2x Polnocny-class landing ships
 6x Vanya-class minesweepers
 4x Yevgenya-class minesweepers
 4x Sonya-class minesweepers
 6x Olya-class minesweepers
 34x R376 type "Yaroslavets" axillary cutters in various configurations

Structure 

 Naval Forces Command, Varna
 Naval Forces Staff
 Naval Operations Center
 Coastal Fundamental System for CIS Support
 Coastal Information Detachment
 Independent Electronic Surveillance Detachment
 Command, Control and Communications Units
 Naval Base Command
 Naval Base Staff
 Naval Base Location Varna
 Naval Base Location Atia
 Repair and Maintenance Center
 Armament and Equipment Storage 
 Ship Divisions
 1st Patrol Ships Division
 3rd Mine Counter-Measure Division
 4th Patrol Ships Division
 6th Mine Counter-Measure Division
 18th Support Ships Division
 96th Support Ships Division
 2nd Coastal Anti-Ship Missile and Artillery Battalion
 Independent Naval Helicopter Air Base "Chayka"
 63rd Naval Special Forces Reconnaissance Detachment "Black Sea Sharks"
 Hydrographical Service of the Naval Forces
 Equipment Storage Base of the Naval Forces
 Military Police Company of the Naval Forces Command

A "Division" is the equivalent of land forces battalion or air force squadron as the Bulgarian Navy follows the Russian naval tradition, according to which an "Operational Squadron" or "Оперативная эскадра" is a temporary formation, an equivalent of a land forces division and in modern times a "Squadron" of the Russian Navy is an equivalent of a land forces corps.

According to the reform plans envisioned in the White Paper on Defence 2010, the two naval bases would be merged into one with two base facilities in Varna and Burgas. The manpower of the Navy would account to about 3,400 seamen. The ordered Eurocopter AS565 MB Panther helicopters were reduced from six to three units. Between 2011 and 2020 the naval "Longterm Investment Plan" should come into action, providing the sea arm of the Bulgarian military with modernised ships and new equipment.

Ships 
The Bulgarian Navy will modernise three of its Wielingen-class frigates in the future. The frigates will be equipped with landing pads, allowing helicopters to land and take off from the ships' decks. The list does not include vessels assigned to the border police. The Bulgarian Ministry of Defense signed a contract on 12/11/2020 with Lürssen Werft Germany to build two patrol boats for the Bulgarian Navy. The boats will be built by the Bulgarian MTG Dolphin shipyard in Varna and delivered in 2025 and 2026 with the 984M lev (approximately €503M) price also including training.

Naval aviation
Chayka Naval Air Base

2 Eurocopter AS565 Panther (6 originally ordered, 3 delivered, 3 later canceled, 1 written off)

1 Eurocopter AS365 Dauphin delivered in late 2019
 

 on 9 June 2017 during a training mission of artillery fire against surface targets as a part of the "Black Sea-2017" exercise of the Bulgarian Navy, a Panther helicopter crashed in the water, killing the commander and injuring the other two officers on board. The helicopter's main rotor made contact with the fore flagpole of the frigate BGS-41 Drazki, after which it crashed into the sea. The crew commander suffered heavy injuries upon the crash, causing his death. The other two crew members suffered minor injuries, mainly by inhaling gases caused after the crash.) The helicopter has been written off and the remaining two units have been grounded for a month on 10 June. After the helicopter struck the flagpole it became increasingly unstable and the commander, Capt. Georgi Anastasov, decided to turn back to the frigate and attempt an emergency landing in the water nearby, maximizing the chances for a rapid emergency recovery by the surface ships nearby. According to the Ministry of Defence and Navy officials his actions have directly contributed to the saving of the other two officers on board with only minor injuries, for his efforts he has been posthumously promoted to Major.
3 Mil Mi-14 (stored in non-flyworthy condition)

Equipment

Ranks

Commissioned officer ranks
The rank insignia of commissioned officers.

Other ranks
The rank insignia of non-commissioned officers and enlisted personnel.

References

Bibliography

External links

Official site of the Bulgarian Naval Forces (Bulgarian)
Official site of the Bulgarian Naval Forces (English)

 
Military units and formations established in 1879